Hoeflea halophila is a Gram-negative, aerobic, motile bacteria from the genus of Hoeflea which was isolated from marine sediment from the Sea of Japan.

References

Rhizobiaceae
Bacteria described in 2013